Paris Store or Paristore is an Asian supermarket situated in France in the region of Paris, Lyon, Marseille, Roubaix, Strasbourg, Toulouse, and Tours.

It has more than 20 branches, including one in the 13th arrondissement of Paris, situated near Tang Frères, another supermarket selling Asian food.

External links
 Paris Store 

Retail companies established in 1977
Asian-French culture
Supermarkets of France
Shops in Paris
13th arrondissement of Paris